Acoustic holography is a method for estimating the sound field near a source by measuring acoustic parameters away from the source by means of an array of pressure and/or particle velocity transducers.  The Measuring techniques included in acoustic holography are becoming increasingly popular in various fields, most notably those of transportation, vehicle and aircraft design, and noise, vibration, and harshness (NVH).  The general idea of acoustic holography has led to different versions such as near-field acoustic holography (NAH) and statistically optimal near-field acoustic holography (SONAH).

For audio rendering and production, Wave Field Synthesis and Higher Order Ambisonics are related technologies, respectively modelling the acoustic pressure field on a plane, or in a spherical volume.

References

External links
 Acoustic holography
 Introduction to Acoustic Holography

Acoustics
Sound measurements